Hibbertia monticola, commonly known as mountain guinea flower, is a species of flowering plant in the family Dilleniaceae and is endemic to south-eastern Queensland. It is a shrub with elliptic to egg-shaped leaves, and yellow flowers with many stamens arranged around three glabrous carpels.

Description 
The edges of the leaves curve downwards, the upper surface has a few white hairs along the mid-vein but the lower surface is glabrous. The flowers are arranged singly in leaf axils and are sessile.

Taxonomy 
Hibbertia monticola was first formally described in 1984 by Trevor Donald Stanley in the journal Austrobaileya from specimens collected by Cyril Tenison White on Mount Ernest in 1932. The specific epithet (monticola) means "dweller in mountains".

Distribution and habitat 
Mountain guinea flower is only known from the Mount Barney National Park in south-eastern Queensland, where it grows in rocky places at altitudes above .

Conservation status 
This hibbertia is classified as "near threatened" under the Queensland Government Nature Conservation Act 1992.

See also 
 List of Hibbertia species

References 

monticola
Flora of Queensland
Plants described in 1984